The 2017–18 Ukrainian Junior Under 19 Championship is the 2nd season of the Ukrainian Junior Under 19 Championship in First League. The competition involved participation of several junior teams of the Professional Football League of Ukraine as well as some other football academies.

Direct administration of the competition belonged to the Youth Football League of Ukraine. The tournament was conducted in cooperation between both Youth Football League and Professional Football League.

Teams
 Debut: Volyn Lutsk, Nika Ivano-Frankivsk, Rukh Vynnyky, DYuSSh Ternopil, DYuSSh Berezhany, Obolon Kyiv, Kolos Kovalivka, Chaika Vyshhorod, Liubomyr Stavyshche, Lokomotyv Kyiv, Atletyk Odesa, Maoldis Dnipro, Heolis Kharkiv, Nikopol-Obriy, SC Dnipro-1
 Withdrawn: Zhemchuzhyna Odesa, Zirka Kyiv, Dinaz Vyshhorod, FC Lviv, Veres Rivne

Group stage

Group 1

Top goalscorers

Group 2

Top goalscorers

Group 3

Top goalscorers

Wild card playoffs
single round robin tournament

Finals
single round robin tournament in Chernivtsi

Semifinals 

|}

Game for 3rd place 

|}

Finals 

|}

Notes

See also
2017–18 Ukrainian First League
2017–18 Ukrainian Second League

References

External links
 Season's results  at the Youth Football League of Ukraine
 Gold Talant, general information on all youth competitions in Ukraine
 Athletic Club Odessa. official website
 FC Lyubomir. official website
 UFC Olimpik Kharkiv. official website

First League
Junior Championship First League